Russian tea cake is a kind of pastry, often eaten around Christmas in the United States.

Ingredients 

Russian tea cakes have a relatively simple recipe, generally consisting entirely of flour, water, butter, and ground nuts, the nut variety depending upon the cookie type. After baking, they are rolled in powdered sugar while still hot, then coated again once the cookie has cooled.

European-based recipes rely upon coarsely chopped hazelnuts, almonds, or walnuts. Mexican wedding cookies traditionally use coarsely chopped pecans.

History 

A reason for the common name "Russian Tea Cake" or any connection to Russian cuisine is unknown. Some have speculated the recipes either derived from other Eastern European shortbread cookies, may have migrated to Mexico with European nuns, or may have been associated with cookies served beside Russian samovars (tea urns). By the 20th century, they were a part of wedding and Christmas and Easter traditions in the U.S., known by their popular "Russian tea cake" or "Mexican wedding cookie" name.

See also 

 List of American desserts
 List of Russian desserts

References 

Cookies
Christmas food
Christmas in the United States
American desserts
Mexican desserts